"The Tree" is a macabre short story by American horror fiction writer H. P. Lovecraft. It was written in 1920, and published in October 1921 in The Tryout. Set in ancient Greece, the story concerns two sculptors who accept a commission with ironic consequences.

Lovecraft wrote "The Tree" early in his career. He was dismissive of the story in a 1936 letter. Such stories, he said, "if typed on good stock make excellent shelf-paper, but little else." The assessment of Lovecraft authority S. T. Joshi was that although the story "may be a trifle obvious… it is an effective display of Lovecraft's skill in handling a historical setting."

Plot

On a slope of Mount Maenalus in Arcadia is an olive grove that grows around a marble tomb and the ruin of an old villa. There, one gigantic tree resembles a frighteningly distorted man, and the roots of the tree have shifted the blocks of the tomb.

The narrator explains that the beekeeper who lives next door told him a story about the tree: Two renowned sculptors, Kalos and Musides, lived in the colonnaded villa, which was "resplendent" in its day. Both men created works that were widely known and celebrated. They were devoted friends, but different in disposition: Musides enjoyed the nightlife, while Kalos preferred the quiet of the olive grove. It was there he was said to receive his inspiration.

One day, emissaries from "the Tyrant of Syracuse" ask the sculptors each to create a statue of Tyché. The statue, they are told, must be "of great size and cunning workmanship", since it is to be "a wonder of nations and a goal of travellers." The most beautiful statue will be erected in the Tyrant's city, Syracuse. Kalos and Musides accept the commission. Secretly, the Tyrant expects the sculptors not only to compete but to cooperate, resulting in statuary that will be truly magnificent.

The work proceeds, and although Musides is still social and active, he seems morose—apparently because Kalos has fallen ill. Despite Kalos' weakened state, his visitors detect in him a serenity that contrasts Musides' dismay. Despite the efforts of his doctors and his friend Musides, Kalos weakens. When Kalos' death seems imminent, Musides weeps and promises to carve for him an elaborate marble sepulchre. Kalos asks that twigs from specific olive trees in the grove be buried near his head. Soon after, Kalos dies in the olive grove.

Musides builds the tomb and buries the olive twigs. From the burial place of the twigs an enormous olive tree grows at an incredible rate. An especially large branch hangs over the villa and Musides' statue.

Three years later, Musides' work on the statue is complete. The Tyrant's agents arrive, then head to town to stay the night. That evening, a windstorm whips down the mountain. When the Tyrant's people return to the villa the next morning, they find it utterly destroyed; the great tree branch has fallen, and Musides' statue has been crushed into unrecognizable pieces. Musides himself is nowhere to be found.

The end of the story recalls the Latin aphorism that precedes the text: "Fata viam invenient" ("fate will find a way").

References

Sources
 Definitive version.

External links
 
 
 

1921 short stories
Ancient Greece in fiction
Horror short stories
Short stories by H. P. Lovecraft
Works originally published in Tryout